Gurdwara Panja Sahib (
) is a famous gurdwara located in Hasan Abdal, Pakistan. The shrine is considered to be particularly important as the handprint of the founder of Sikhism, Guru Nanak, is believed to be imprinted on a boulder at the gurdwara.

History

Guru Nanak along with Bhai Mardana reached Hasan Abdal in Baisakh Samwat 1578 B.K., corresponding to the summer of 1521 CE, when according to Sikh legend, Guru Nanak's handprint was imprinted onto a boulder. The Gurdwara was named Panja Sahib by Hari Singh Nalwa, the most famous general of the Sikh Empire. He is credited with having built the first gurdwara at the site.

Legend
Under a shady cool tree, Guru Nanak and Bhai Mardana started reciting Kirtan and their devotees gathered around. This annoyed a local saint, Shah Wali Qandhari.

According to Sikh legend, Bhai Mardana was sent three times to Shah Wali Qandhari by Guru Nanak so that he would provide him with some water to quench his thirst. Wali Qandhari refused his request and was rude to him. In spite of this, Mardana still very politely stuck to his demand. The Wali remarked : "Why don't you ask your Master whom you serve?"

Mardana Ji went back to the Guru in a miserable state and said "Oh lord! I prefer death to thirst but will not approach Wali the egoist."

The Guru replied "Oh Bhai Mardana ji! Repeat the Name of God, the Almighty; and drink the water to your heart's content."

The Guru put aside a big rock lying nearby and a pure fountain of water sprang up and began to flow endlessly. Bhai Mardana quenched his thirst and felt grateful to the Guru.

On the other hand, the fountain of Shah Wali Qandhari dried up. On witnessing this, the Wali in his rage threw a part of a mountain towards the Guru from the top of the hill. The Guru stopped the hurled rock. Clear, fresh spring water gushes out from somewhere behind the rock and spills over into a very large pool. An imprint of a right hand was carved on the rock while it was built in the Mughal style by Maharaja Ranjit Singh (1780-1839).

Observing that miracle, Wali became the Guru's devotee.

Gallery

References

External links
Hasan Abdal 
Join Panja Sahib Network @ Ning
Gurudwara Panja Sahib 

Gurdwaras in Pakistan
Guru Nanak Dev